Dave Allardice (born 11 February 1975) is a British short track speed skater. He competed at the 1998 Winter Olympics and the 2002 Winter Olympics.

References

External links
 

1975 births
Living people
British male short track speed skaters
Olympic short track speed skaters of Great Britain
Short track speed skaters at the 1998 Winter Olympics
Short track speed skaters at the 2002 Winter Olympics
Sportspeople from Paisley, Renfrewshire